N-Acetylanthranilic acid is an organic compound with the molecular formula C9H9NO3. It is an intermediate product in catabolism of quinaldine in Arthrobacter sp., and is further metabolized to anthranilic acid.

N-Acetylanthranilic acid can be synthesized from 2-bromoacetanilide via palladium-catalyzed carbonylation in tri-n-butylamine-water at 110-130 °C, under 3 atm of carbon monoxide. In the laboratory, it can be easily synthesized from anthranilic acid and acetic anhydride.

N-Acetylanthranilic acid exhibits triboluminescence when crushed. The fractured crystals have large electrical potentials between areas of high and low charge. When the electrons suddenly migrate to neutralize these potentials, flashes of deep blue light are created.

In the United States, it is a Drug Enforcement Administration-controlled Table I illicit drug precursor, because it has been used in the synthesis of methaqualone.

See also
 Acedoben

References

Anthranilic acids
Acetanilides